In fluid dynamics, Rayleigh problem also known as Stokes first problem is a problem of determining the flow created by a sudden movement of an infinitely long plate from rest, named after Lord Rayleigh and Sir George Stokes. This is considered as one of the simplest unsteady problem that have exact solution for the Navier-Stokes equations. The impulse movement of semi-infinite plate was studied by Keith Stewartson.

Flow descriptionLagerstrom, Paco Axel. Laminar flow theory. Princeton University Press, 1996.
The incompressible Navier-Stokes equations reduce to

where  is the kinematic viscosity. The initial and the no-slip condition on the wall are

The flow is only due to the motion of the plate, there is no imposed pressure gradient.

Self-Similar solution

The problem on the whole is similar to the one dimensional heat conduction problem. Hence a self-similar variable can be introduced

Substituting this the partial differential equation, reduces it to ordinary differential equation

with boundary conditions

The solution to the above problem can be written  in terms of complementary error function

The force per unit area exerted on the plate is

Arbitrary wall motion

Instead of using a step boundary condition for the wall movement, the velocity of the wall can be prescribed as an arbitrary function of time, i.e., . Then the solution is given by

Rayleigh's problem in cylindrical geometry

Rotating cylinder

Consider an infinitely long cylinder of radius  starts rotating suddenly at time  with an angular velocity . Then the velocity in the  direction is given by

where  is the modified Bessel function of the second kind. As , the solution approaches that of a rigid vortex. The force per unit area exerted on the cylinder is

where  is the modified Bessel function of the first kind.

Sliding cylinder

Exact solution is also available when the cylinder starts to slide in the axial direction with constant velocity . If we consider the cylinder axis to be in  direction, then the solution is given by

See also

Stokes problem

References

Fluid dynamics